Papaipema impecuniosa, also known as the aster borer moth or impecunious borer, is a moth in the family Noctuidae. It is found in eastern North America, where it ranges from Nova Scotia to Georgia, west to Illinois and north to Wisconsin and Ontario.

The larvae feed on Aster species and Helenium autumnale. They bore into the stems and roots of their host plant.

References

Papaipema
Moths described in 1881